RRG may be:
 Reichs-Rundfunk-Gesellschaft, a network of German broadcasting companies
 Rhön-Rossitten Gesellschaft, a German gliding organization
 Role and Reference Grammar, a model of natural language grammar
 Rolls-Royce Ghost, a luxury saloon car